Henrik Batikyan (born 12 February 1977) is an Armenian footballer. He currently plays for the Armenian Premier League club Shirak Gyumri.

External links
 

Living people
1977 births
Armenian footballers
Armenia international footballers
FC Shirak players
Armenian Premier League players
Association football midfielders